Guy Gilles  born Guy Chiche (25 August 1938 - 3 February 1996) was a French film director.

Biography
He directed his first short film, Soleil éteint in 1958. He changed his surname to Gilles based on the name of his mother (Gilette) to create a pseudonym. After studying at the Beaux-Arts, he moved to Paris, where he worked as an assistant to François Reichenbach in 1964.

His first feature film, L'Amour à la mer (1962), starred Daniel Moosmann and Geneviève Thénier, with guest appearances by Juliette Gréco, Alain Delon and Jean-Pierre Léaud. Patrick Jouan featured in many of his films. He also worked for television with productions such as Dim Dam Dom and Pour le plaisir.

His romantic relationship with Jeanne Moreau seemed to inspire the movie Absences répétées which received the Prix Jean-Vigo in 1973.

Hélène Martin requested him to make a documentary about Jean Genet Saint, poète et martyr. It was released at a gay film festival organized by Lionel Soukaz in 1978, and the film was troubled by a fascist group that injured the director.

His latest films include Le Crime d'amour (1982), with Richard Berry and Jacques Penot, and  Nuit docile (1987). He contracted AIDS in the late 1980s, and in experiencing difficulties with production, he struggled to complete Néfertiti, la fille du soleil in 1994 which was released in 1996 on the year of death.

A retrospective was presented at the 31st  International Film Festival of La Rochelle in July 2003.

Filmography

Film
 1956 : Les chasseurs d'autographes
 1958 : Soleil éteint
 1959 : Au biseau des baisers
 1961 : Mélancholia
 1964 : Journal d'un combat
 1964 : L'Amour à la mer
 1965 : Paris un jour d'hiver
 1966 : Les cafés de Paris
 1966 : Chanson de geste
 1966 : Le jardin des Tuileries
 1966 : Les cafés de Paris
 1967 : Un dimanche à Aurillac
 1968 : Au pan coupé
 1970 : Le clair de terre
 1971 : Côté cour, côté champs
 1972 : Absences répétées
 1974 : Le Jardin qui bascule
 1976 : Montreur d'images
 1982 : Le Crime d'amour
 1987 : La Nuit docile
 1994 : Néfertiti, la fille du soleil

Television
 1965 : Ciné Bijou
 1966 : Pop'âge
 1967 : Festivals 1966 Cinémas 1967
 1969 : Vie retrouvée
 1969 : Le Partant
 1971 : Proust, l'art et la douleur
 1974 : Saint, poète et martyr (about Jean Genet)
 1975 : La Loterie de la vie
 1975 : La Vie filmée : 1946-54
 1983 : Où sont-elle donc ?
 1984 : Un garçon de France, based on Pascal Sevran's novel
 1992 : Dis papa, raconte-moi là-bas about Algeria
 1994 : La Lettre de Jean about toxicomania

External links
 Further reading
 

French film directors
1938 births
1996 deaths
People from Algiers